The Sky Is Falling, also known as Las Flores Del Vicio (English: The Flowers of Vice), released in the United States as  Bloodbath, is a 1979 Spanish surrealist thriller film directed by Silvio Narizzano and written by Gonzalo Suarez. It stars Dennis Hopper, Carroll Baker, and Win Wells as hopeless American expatriates living in a Spanish village where citizens are dying mysterious deaths after the arrival of a religious cult. The film has been characterized as an example of the frenetic roles played by Hopper in the 1970s.

Plot
A drug-addicted poet named Chicken (Hopper), struggling to separate reality from fantasy, lives in a small Spanish village with other expatriates. These include a washed up alcoholic actress named Treasure (Carroll Baker), a retired British Air Corps captain (Richard Todd) and his alcoholic wife (Faith Brook), and a jaded homosexual man (Win Wells).

Chicken struggles with his addiction while having vivid hallucinations about his religious mother. Treasure is always waiting for a call from Hollywood in order to stage a comeback, and spends her time showing off her album of publicity photos. The expatriates, bored by their life in the village, encounter a group of young hippies who they feel a bond toward, but throughout the film each of the expatriates end up dead in various, disturbing ways. These deaths are juxtaposed with the life of the villagers in bizarre and surreal ways that develops a sense of menace in the film. It is implied that the deaths are caused by the band of hippies evoking a religious cult or the Manson family, and the deaths of the villagers are followed by a communal funeral held on Good Friday.

Cast
Dennis Hopper as Chicken
Carroll Baker as Treasure
Richard Todd as Terence
Faith Brook as Heather
Win Wells as Allen
David Carpenter as Salt
Alibe as Susannah
Inma de Santis as Buenaventura
Curtis Moseley as Young Chicken
Ana Pastor as Pucherita

Production
The film was filmed in Mojacar, Almeria, Spain in 1979, a small seaside village of local Spaniards, British and American expatriates, some of whom were featured in this movie. One of the extras, a young boy who was trampled at the end of the movie, looking towards the sky, was an American living in Spain whose parents ran a local saloon (El Saloon) and had befriended the director and many of the cast members.

Both Carroll Baker and Dennis Hopper, who had starred together in Giant (1956), had been out of major Hollywood pictures for some time when they were cast in the film; Baker had been living in Europe and making giallo and horror films in Italian productions.

References

External links
 
 Dennis Hopper page on Pimpadelic Wonderland
 In-depth review of "The Sky Is Falling" (1979) aka "Bloodbath" at SoiledSinema.com

1979 films
English-language Spanish films
1970s horror thriller films
1979 horror films
Spanish horror thriller films
1970s avant-garde and experimental films
Films directed by Silvio Narizzano
Films set in Spain
Films shot in Almería